Saygılı can refer to:

 Saygılı, Çayırlı
 Saygılı, Suluova